Slavgorod is a town in Altai Krai, Russia, located between Lakes Sekachi and Bolshoye Yarovoye. Population:    48,000 (1975).

History
It was founded in 1910 and was granted town status in 1914.

Administrative and municipal status
Within the framework of administrative divisions, Slavgorod is, together with twenty-three rural localities, incorporated as the town of krai significance of Slavgorod—an administrative unit with a status equal to that of the districts. As a municipal division, the town of krai significance of Slavgorod is incorporated as Slavgorod Urban Okrug.

Both administrative and municipal territories of Slavgorod were enlarged effective January 1, 2012, when Slavgorodsky District was abolished.

Military
During the Cold War it was the site of Slavgorod air base.

Climate

References

Notes

Sources

Cities and towns in Altai Krai
Populated places in Slavgorod urban okrug